Hafiz Bakhshaliyev (1 April 1980, Nakhchivan, Azerbaijan SSR) is an Azerbaijani athlete, European and World  Kick Boxing Champion.  He is a current three times World Association of Kickboxing Organizations World Heavyweight Low Kick Champion.

Early life and education 
Hafiz Bakhshaliyev was born on 1 April 1980 in Nakhchivan, Azerbaijan SSR. In 1996, he completed his secondary education in Nakhchivan. In 1996, he entered Tafakkur University and graduated in 2000 with a degree in Economy. From 2000 through 2001, Bakhshaliyev served in the Azerbaijani Armed Forces.

Kickboxing career 
Bakhshaliyev started his Kickboxing career in 1997. In -91 kg/201 lb tournament he represented Azerbaijan in international competitions. Over the years he has been a gold, silver and bronze medalist in the World and European championships. In 2007, Bakhshaliyev represented Azerbaijan for the first time in professional K-1 competitions.

In 2005, he started the "Россия против Мир"  professional kickboxing competition among the most powerful athletes of the world and was the only one who defeated the Russian kick boxer during the whole competition.

He lives in London since 2009. Though Bakhshaliyev retired from the sport in 2011, he decided to fight again in 2017.

Bakhshaliyev defeated Spanish athlete Ismail Bergman with a knockdown for the title of the Interprofessional European Champion in Cardiff, Wales and won the European belt in the UK. Bakhshaliyev often participates in sport competitions  and events of Azerbaijani diaspora on Karabakh and Azerbaijan. He established The Union of Azerbaijani Athletes Living Abroad with Elnur Elturk, who is the Head of the Department of Free Electronic Resources in the Central Library of Science of Azerbaijan National Academy of Sciences.

Titles and accomplishments 
 Seven times Azerbaijani Champion
 2010 - British Champion
 2004, 2006, 2008 - World Champion
 2003, 2008, 2017 - European Champion

See also 
List of WAKO Amateur European Championships
List of WAKO Amateur World Championships
List of male kickboxers

References 

1980 births
Living people
Heavyweight kickboxers
Azerbaijani male kickboxers